The Maritime Trades Department, AFL–CIO (MTD) is one of seven constitutionally-mandated departments of the AFL–CIO. Formed on August 19, 1946, by the American Federation of Labor, the stated goal of the department is to give "workers employed in the maritime industry and its allied trades a voice in shaping national policy."

In efforts to support the U.S. maritime industry, MTD has helped promote legislation such as:
 The Cargo Preference Act of 1954
 The Merchant Marine Act of 1970
 The Maritime Security Act of 1995

The MTD has a network of 19 port maritime councils across the United States and Canada, as well as 24 affiliate unions.

Presidents
 Joseph P. Ryan, 1952-1955
 Harry Lundeberg, 1955–1957
 Paul Hall, 1957 – 22 June 1980
 Frank Drozak, 1980–1988
 Michael Sacco, 1988–present

See also

 American Maritime Officers
 National Maritime Union
 Paul Hall
 Michael Sacco
 United States Merchant Marine

Notes

References

External links
 About the MTD

Archives
 Merle Daniel Adlum Papers. 1945–1986. 67.56 cubic feet. Contains records from Adlum's service as President of the Puget Sound Division of the AFL-CIO's Maritime Trades Department from 1968 to 1983.
 King County Labor Council of Washington Records. 1889–2012. 41.26 cubic ft. (61 boxes). Contains administrative records pertaining to the AFL-CIO Maritime Trades Department.

1946 establishments in the United States
AFL–CIO
Maritime trade unions
Trade unions established in 1946